Milosaurus is an extinct genus of non-mammalian synapsids native to Illinois that was alive during the latest Carboniferous and earliest Permian. It was named in 1970 on the basis of FMNH 701, a partial skeleton (a pelvis, a hind limb and pes and caudal vertebrae).

See also

 List of pelycosaurs

References

Prehistoric eupelycosaurs
Prehistoric synapsid genera
Fossil taxa described in 1970